Sheikh Mujibur Rahman (1920–1975) was a politician and statesman who became the first President of Bangladesh. 

Mujibur Rahman may also refer to:
Mujibur Rahman (scientist) (1919–2015), Bangladeshi medical academic
Mojibur Rahman (politician) (1936–1984), Bangladeshi politician from Lalmonirhat
Mojibur Rahman (born 1995), Bangladeshi cricketer
Mojibur Rahman (officer) (born 1968), general of the Bangladesh Army
Mujibur Rahman (Sri Lankan politician) (born 1968), Sri Lankan politician
Mujibur Rahman (academic) (fl. 1980s), Bangladeshi politician from and former member of parliament from Rajshahi-1
Mujibur Rahman (Bangladeshi politician) (fl. 1990s), Bangladeshi politician from Dinajpur District
Sheikh Mujibur Rahman (Bangladeshi politician) (fl. 1990s–2000s), Bangladeshi politician from Bagerhat District
Mujibur Rehman (fl. 2006), Indian activist
Mujibur Rahman of Mujibur and Sirajul (fl. 1990s–2000s), guests on The Late Show with David Letterman
Mujeeb Ur Rahman (born 2001), Afghan cricketer

People with the given names
Mujibur Rahman Chowdhury (born 1978), Bangladeshi politician from Faridpur
Mujibur Rahman Devdas (born 1930), Bangladeshi activist
Mujibur Rahman Dilu (born 1951), Bangladeshi actor and director
Mujibur Rahman Dulu, Bangladeshi film editor
Mozibur Rahman Fakir (1947–2016), Bangladeshi politician from Mymensingh
Mujibur Rahman Khan (1910–1984), Bangladeshi journalist
Mujibur Rahman Khan (politician) (1873–1940) journalist and Indian nationalist activist
Mujibur Rahman Monju (1947–2015), Bangladeshi politician from Kishoreganj

Rahman, Mujibur